Jan de Kreek (11 October 1903 – 14 February 1988) was a Dutch footballer. He played in three matches for the Netherlands national football team in 1930.

References

External links
 

1903 births
1988 deaths
Dutch footballers
Netherlands international footballers
Place of birth missing
Association footballers not categorized by position